Universidad Católica Santo Domingo ("Santo Domingo Catholic University"; acronym, UCSD; also known as La Católica) –is a private Catholic university located in the archdiocese of Santo Domingo, in the Dominican Republic.  The university was established in 1982, with 65 students entering the school in the following year.

The university contains 5,000 students and 250 faculty members. It is commonly known as "La Católica", and its population is mostly middle-class students who work and study full-time, and pay their own tuition.

Faculties: 
 Diplomacy and International Relations; 
 Odontology or Dentistry; 
 Engineering system; 
 Architecture; 
 Economics; 
 Psychology; 
 Faculty of Law; 
 Tourism; 
 Social communication; 
 Administration; 
 Physiotherapy, 
 Marketing.

The university sports department has a soccer team with Prof. Jaime Paez as head coach, Lendz Heriveaux as coach assistant and Serge Junior Fecu as captain. There are basketball and volleyball teams. Both Futsal and regular soccer are played.

Notable alumni 

 Marsha K. Caddle, Politician and economist
 Jonathan Delgado, Diplomat

Educational institutions established in 1982
Buildings and structures in Santo Domingo
Roman Catholic universities and colleges in the Caribbean
Universidad Católica Santo Domingo
Education in Santo Domingo
1982 establishments in the Dominican Republic